Tyus Dwayne Edney Sr. (born February 14, 1973) is an American basketball coach and former player who is an assistant coach for the San Diego Toreros men's team of the West Coast Conference (WCC). He played college basketball for the UCLA Bruins from 1991 to 1995, leading them to the 1995 NCAA national championship. His game-winning shot for UCLA, in the second round of the 1995 NCAA Tournament, is considered to be one of the most famous plays in NCAA Tournament history. A two-time All-EuroLeague First Team selection, he led Žalgiris Kaunas to the 1999 EuroLeague title and was named the EuroLeague Final Four MVP. He became an assistant coach for UCLA.

College career
In his freshman season at UCLA in 1992, Edney was named the most valuable freshman player on his team. In his sophomore season, Edney was voted the team's most valuable player (MVP), and he was named to the first-team All-Pacific-10 (Pac-10) Conference team. He was again named to the first-team All-Pac-10 conference team in 1994. As a senior in 1994–95, Edney set personal bests in total points (456), steals (74), and assists (216).

Edney was inducted into the UCLA Athletics Hall of Fame in 2009, as well as the Pac-12 Conference Hall of Honor in 2014. He ranks second in the school's history in career assists (652) and third in steals (224).

1995 NCAA Tournament
Edney's late game heroics in the 1995 Men's Division I Basketball Tournament have earned him a spot in NCAA Tournament lore. Edney's UCLA squad had played well in the 1994–1995 season, earning a No. 1 seed in the West Region of the tournament.  Favored in their second round match against eighth seed Missouri, UCLA fell behind 74–73 with just 4.8 seconds remaining.  Bruins coach Jim Harrick, after calling timeout, turned to Edney, the point guard, rather than to their star player, Ed O'Bannon.

Cameron Dollar inbounded the ball to Edney who caught it in stride and took off up the left sideline.  A Missouri defender picked him up at about the top of the key, although not with extreme on-ball pressure due to a fear of fouling.  At midcourt, another defender attempted to trap, but Edney used a behind-the-back dribble that evaded the pressure.  After Edney reached the Missouri key, 6'9" Missouri forward Derek Grimm slid over in an attempt to stop him.  Edney adjusted his shot around Grimm, and banked the shot in at the buzzer. The ball dramatically drained through the net as the game ending red light blazed.  UCLA won the game 75–74.

Two games later against the Connecticut Huskies, Edney had another chance at a full court run before the half, and drained a 30-foot 3-pointer en route to a 102–96 victory.  UCLA went on to win its 11th NCAA basketball championship, defeating the defending champion Arkansas Razorbacks 89–78, (although Edney, with a wrist injured in the semi-final win vs. Oklahoma State, mostly watched from the bench). But UCLA's record 11th National Championship would have been impossible had Edney's full court runner vs. Missouri not fallen. Edney was named to the Tournament Western Regional All-Tournament team.

Professional playing career

NBA
Edney was selected by the Sacramento Kings in the second round of the 1995 NBA draft with the 47th overall pick . He was named to the NBA All-Rookie Second Team and played with the Kings for two seasons (1995–1997). He spent the 1997–1998 season with the Boston Celtics. After playing in Europe for 2 years (Lithuania 1998–1999, and Italy 1999–2000), he returned to the NBA, and played with the Indiana Pacers, in the 2000–2001 season. In total, he played in 4 NBA seasons. In the NBA, he could never top his rookie year with the Kings, when he averaged 10.8 points per game, and had a total of 491 total.

Europe
In the 1998–1999 season, Edney won the EuroLeague championship with the Lithuanian club Žalgiris Kaunas, earning the EuroLeague Final Four MVP award in the process. He and teammate George Zidek, who also won a title with Edney at UCLA, became the first players to win both an NCAA and EuroLeague championship. Edney then played in Italy, during the 1999–2000 season, with Benetton Treviso (losing in the Italian League finals, and winning the Italian Cup title). After that season, he spent the next season (2000–2001) playing in the NBA.

Following his departure from the NBA, in 2001, Edney bounced around several European teams, including another stint with Benetton Treviso (2001–2004, where he won the Italian league in 2002 and 2003, the Italian Cup in 2003 and 2004, and the Italian Supercup in 2001 and 2002; and played in the EuroLeague Final in 2003) and Lottomatica Roma (2004–2005). After the 2004–2005 season, George Garbolas brought Edney to Olympiacos, in order to help the team challenge in Greece and in Europe.

Edney was one of the players upon whom the new Olympiacos team was supposed to be built, but he only played there for one season, in 2005–2006. In the 2006–2007 season, he returned to Italy, to play with Climamio Bologna. He started the 2008–2009 season in the Spanish club Cajasol Sevilla, and then (January 2009) moved to the Polish club Turów Zgorzelec.

In a 2005 profile in the L.A. Times, former UCLA Bruin teammate Ed O'Bannon, said that Edney was hugely popular in Europe, saying, "his style, his size, the fact that his teams always win; he's somewhat of a novelty, a celebrity. When my teammates overseas found out that I played with him, it would be like someone in the States finding out that you played with Michael Jordan."

Later years
On August 2, 2010, it was announced by UCLA head coach Ben Howland, that Edney had joined the Bruins as director of men's basketball operations. In his seven-year stint that role, UCLA made it to the NCAA Tournament five times.

On April 21, 2017, UCLA announced that Edney had been promoted to a full assistant, on head coach Steve Alford's staff, replacing Ed Schilling, who left to join Archie Miller's staff at Indiana. Alford was fired midseason in 2018–19. After the season, Edney was not retained by new incoming head coach Mick Cronin. In August 2019, Edney was named the director of engagement for the UCLA athletic department.

Edney joined the San Diego Toreros men's team in 2022 to serve as an assistant under head coach Steve Lavin, who was an assistant coach at UCLA during Edney's college playing career.

Career statistics

NBA

Regular season

|-
| style="text-align:left;"| 
| style="text-align:left;"| Sacramento
| 80 || 60 || 31.0 || .412 || .368 || .782 || 2.5 || 6.1 || 1.1 || .0 || 10.8
|-
| style="text-align:left;"| 
| style="text-align:left;"| Sacramento
| 70 || 20 || 19.7 || .384 || .190 || .823 || 1.6 || 3.2 || 0.9 || .0 || 6.9
|-
| style="text-align:left;"| 
| style="text-align:left;"| Boston
| 52 || 7 || 12.0 || .431 || .300 || .793 || 1.1 || '2.7 || 1.0 || .0 || 5.3
|-
| style="text-align:left;"|  
| style="text-align:left;"| Indiana
| 24 || 0 || 11.0 || .385 || .167 || .897 || 1.0 || 2.3 || .7 || .0 || 4.4
|- class="sortbottom"
| style="text-align:center;" colspan=2| Career
| 226 || 87 || 21.0 || .405|| .322|| .806|| 1.7 || 4.0 || 1.0 || .0 || 7.6

Playoffs

|-
| style="text-align:left;"| 1996
| style="text-align:left;"| Sacramento
| 4 || 4 || 30.3 || .429 || .250 || .833 || 3.0 || 2.8 || 2.0 || .0 || 12.0
|-
| style="text-align:left;"| 2001
| style="text-align:left;"| Indiana
| 2 || 0 || 5.0 || .286 || .000 || .000 || .0 || 1.5 || .5 || .0 || 2.0
|- class="sortbottom"
| style="text-align:center;" colspan=2| Career
| 6 || 4 || 21.8 || .408 || .222 || .769 || 2.0 || 2.3 || 1.5 || .0 || 8.7

EuroLeague

|-
| style="text-align:left;"| 1998–99  (FIBA)
| style="text-align:left;"| Žalgiris
| 22 ||  || 27.4 || .505 || .360 || .757 || 2.6 || 6.1 || 1.8 || 0.0 || 12.5 || 
|-
| style="text-align:left;"| 1999–00  (FIBA)
| style="text-align:left;"| Benetton
| 14 ||  || 33.6 || .497 || .412 || .800 || 3.8 || 3.4 || 2.2 || 0.0 || 16.9 || 
|-
| style="text-align:left;"| 2001–02
| style="text-align:left;"| Benetton
| 19 || 16 || 30.3 || .513 || .418 || .786 || 3.6 || 3.8 || 2.1 || .1 || 17.9 || 20.3
|-
| style="text-align:left;"| 2002–03
| style="text-align:left;"| Benetton
| 18 || 17 || 28.7 || .509 || .524 || .843 || 2.4 || 4.3 || 1.6 || .1 || 16.5 || 18.2
|-
| style="text-align:left;"| 2003–04
| style="text-align:left;"| Benetton
| 18 || 17 || 30.1 || .458 || .333 || .840 || 1.9 || 4.6 || 1.3 || .1 || 15.2 || 16.9
|-
| style="text-align:left;"| 2005–06
| style="text-align:left;"| Olympiacos
| 23 || 23 || 30.6 || .474 || .343 || .776 || 3.0 || 4.5 || 1.1 || .0 || 13.3 || 15.2
|-
| style="text-align:left;"| 2006–07
| style="text-align:left;"| Climamio Bologna
| 12 || 10 || 30.1 || .471 || .263 || .814 || 2.5 || 4.1 || 1.0 || .0 || 12.7 || 13.9
|- class="sortbottom"
| style="text-align:center;" colspan=2| Career
| 126 || 83 || 30.0 || .490 || .392 || .796 || 2.9 || 4.5 || 1.6 || .1 || 14.9 || 17.0

Personal life
Edney married his first wife, Buffy, shortly after graduating from UCLA. They have two daughters, Kennedi and Kolbi-Rae. Edney met his Italian-Brazilian second wife, Aiñoa Da Silva, in Treviso, and they have a son Tyus Jr. Edney's daughter Kennedi is a college gymnast for the LSU Tigers, a winner of the vault title at the 2019 NCAA Women's Gymnastics Championship.

See also

 List of NCAA Division I men's basketball players with 11 or more steals in a game

References

External links 

Euroleague.net Profile
FIBA Europe Profile
Spanish League Archive Profile 
Italian League Profile 
Lithuanian League Profile
UCLA bio
YouTube Video of game winning shot against Missouri in the 1995 NCAA Tournament

1973 births
Living people
African-American basketball players
American expatriate basketball people in Greece
American expatriate basketball people in Italy
American expatriate basketball people in Lithuania
American expatriate basketball people in Poland
American expatriate basketball people in Spain
American expatriate basketball people in Ukraine
American men's basketball players
Basketball coaches from California
Basketball players from California
BC Azovmash players
BC Žalgiris players
Boston Celtics players
Competitors at the 1994 Goodwill Games
Fortitudo Pallacanestro Bologna players
Goodwill Games medalists in basketball
Indiana Pacers players
Lega Basket Serie A players
Liga ACB players
Olympiacos B.C. players
Pallacanestro Treviso players
Pallacanestro Virtus Roma players
People from Gardena, California
Point guards
Real Betis Baloncesto players
Sacramento Kings draft picks
Sacramento Kings players
Sportspeople from Los Angeles County, California
Turów Zgorzelec players
UCLA Bruins men's basketball coaches
UCLA Bruins men's basketball players
United States men's national basketball team players
21st-century African-American sportspeople
20th-century African-American sportspeople
Long Beach Polytechnic High School alumni